The Frank E. Kilroe Mile is an American Thoroughbred horse race run in early March at Santa Anita Park in Arcadia, California. Open to horses four years of age and older, it is raced over a distance of one mile (1.6 km). The Grade I race currently offers a purse of $500,000.

The Frank E. Kilroe Mile is the official name of the race according to Santa Anita, but it is also commonly called the Frank E. Kilroe Mile Stakes. The race is named for Frank E. Kilroe, who was the racing secretary and handicapper at Santa Anita from 1953 to 1990. Kilroe was inducted into the National Museum of Racing and Hall of Fame in 2019 as a Pillar of the Turf.

History
The race was inaugurated in 1960 as the Arcadia Handicap (1960–2000) and was renamed as the Frank E. Kilroe Mile Handicap in 2001. In 2010, it changed from a handicap to a stakes run on an allowance weight base.

It was raced at a distance of  miles until 1987. In 1972, the distance at which it was raced was "about"  miles. In 1987, the distance was changed to one mile. In 1975, 1976, 1978, 1983, 1995, the race was switched from turf to dirt due to weather conditions. The race was upgraded to Grade I status in 2005.

The race was open to three-year-olds and up in 1962.

In 2010, Proviso became the first female to win the Kilroe in 51 runnings.

Records
Time record: (on turf at current distance of 1 mile)
 1:31.89 – Atticus (1997)

Most wins:
 2 – Ga Hai (1975, 1976)

Most wins by an owner:
 2 – Laguna Seca (1975, 1976)
 2 - Agave Racing Stable (2018, 2022)

Most wins by a jockey:
 8 – Laffit Pincay Jr. (1970, 1978, 1979, 1981, 1982, 1992, 1995, 2001)

Most wins by a trainer:
 7 – Charles Whittingham (1971, 1972, 1977, 1978, 1982, 1986, 1987)

Winners of the Frank E. Kilroe Mile

*Note: Run in two divisions in 1972 and 1973.

References

Grade 1 turf stakes races in the United States
Horse races in the United States
Open mile category horse races
Santa Anita Park